Streets of Rage is a series of side-scrolling beat 'em up video games, centering on the efforts of several ex-police vigilantes trying to rid a fictional, large American city from a crime syndicate that has corrupted its local government.  The first three games in the franchise were developed and published by Sega for the Sega Genesis in the early 1990s and have since been ported and re-released on various platforms. A fourth entry was released in 2020.

The games were well-received and have been re-released many times both on compilations and as standalone games. The electronic dance music soundtracks of the games, scored primarily by Yuzo Koshiro and Motohiro Kawashima, have also received praise.

History

Original trilogy

Three games in the series were released between 1991 and 1994. The first entry, Streets of Rage, introduced the four main characters, three young former police officers, Axel Stone, Blaze Fielding and Adam Hunter, and Mr. X, an evil mastermind. It is the only game in the series to feature a Shinobi-style special attack that defeats all non-boss enemies on-screen. Streets of Rage was supported by Sega's Mega Drive/Genesis, Master System and Game Gear consoles.

The second entry in the series, Streets of Rage 2, had new music (influenced by early '90s club music) from series composer Yuzo Koshiro and newcomer composer Motohiro Kawashima, more defined graphics and a larger selection of moves. It also introduced two new characters: Eddie "Skate" Hunter, and Max Thunder (or Sammy "Skate" Hunter and Max Hatchett in some regions). Like the original title, Streets of Rage 2 was playable on Sega's Genesis, Master System, and Game Gear.

The third entry to the Streets of Rage series, Streets of Rage 3, was less well-received than its predecessors; despite some enhancements, it was seen as very similar to Streets of Rage 2. This entry added a more complex storyline told using cutscenes. The Western version featured increased difficulty, with other elements altered or censored from the Japanese release. The music, again composed by Koshiro and Kawashima, was also criticized for being radically different from the music from the first two games. Unlike the two preceding games, Streets of Rage 3 was available only on the Genesis.

Series hiatus
Although it was one of the most popular Sega franchises in the 1990s, no new official Streets of Rage games were released for over 25 years after Streets of Rage 3, excluding rereleases of the first three games via various Sega game compilations.

Sega is reported to have attempted to bring the series to the Saturn, and early in the production cycle for Sega's Dreamcast a demo tentatively titled Streets of Rage 4 was made by Ancient. It showed a character similar to Axel fighting a group of enemies. Neither the Saturn nor the Dreamcast game, however, came to fruition. Backbone Entertainment later pitched a new Streets of Rage game to Sega, but this project also failed to proceed.

Numerous unofficial fan-made projects and remakes have been developed, including Beats of Rage and Streets of Rage Remake.

Revival

The 2015 crossover game Project X Zone 2 featured Axel Stone as a playable character, along with the Mr. X-possessed Robot Axel as a boss character. This marked the first new appearance of Streets of Rage characters in over 20 years.

The first new entry in the series since the Genesis, Streets of Rage 4, was announced in 2018 and released in 2020, taking place ten years after the events of Streets of Rage 3. The game was developed by Lizardcube, Guard Crush Games, and Dotemu, who previously released the 2017 remake of Wonder Boy III: The Dragon's Trap.

A spin-off minigame based on the Yakuza series, Streets of Kamurocho, was released as part of Sega's 60th anniversary celebration. It was developed by Empty Clip Studios and was only available for Windows via Steam on October 17–19, 2020.

Other media

Comics
Three six-part comic strip series based upon the games appeared in Sonic the Comic in the early 1990s (along with several other adaptations of popular Sega franchises). The first two of these were written by Mark Millar, while the third (and a Poster Mag story) was written by Nigel Kitching. These three stories are an alternate continuity from the games and do not feature Adam. A graphic novel compilation of the original four-part "Streets of Rage" strip was released as a book titled Streets of Rage: Bad City Fighters in the UK in 1994.

The first story, entitled simply Streets of Rage, involved Axel, Blaze, and Max quitting the highly corrupt police force in order to do more good as vigilantes, taking down Max's ex-partner; the crime lord and martial artist Hawk. The next serial, Skates' Story, introduced Skates, delinquent stepson of Murphy, a friend of Axel and his team and one of the few honest cops left on the force, who was unwillingly drawn into joining Axel's group after his stepfather was killed by Mr. X. The third and final story, The Only Game In Town, involved the Syndicate unleashing an army of street gangs. The Poster Mag story The Facts of Life features Axel, Blaze, Skate, and Max.

Music

The game's soundtrack was acclaimed, with several soundtrack albums being released. The soundtracks were composed by Yuzo Koshiro. Another musician, Motohiro Kawashima, helped on the second, providing a few tracks, and making almost half of the tracks for the third. Three soundtrack CDs were released in all, each of which now sell for high prices at auction and in Japanese markets.

The soundtracks mainly consist of, often experimental, chiptune-based electronic dance music, encompassing electronic genres such as electro, house, techno, hardcore, jungle, ambient, breakbeat, gabber, noise, and trance. The music was produced using the Yamaha FM-synth sound chips of the Sega Mega Drive / Genesis video game console (YM2612) and NEC PC-88 computer (YM2608), along with Koshiro's own audio programming language "Music Love," a modified version of the PC-88's Music Macro Language (MML).<ref name="hg101_retro"> Reprinted from {{citation|title=[[Retro Gamer|Retro Gamer]]|issue=67|year=2009}}</ref>

The soundtracks have been critically acclaimed. They are considered ahead of their time, and as some of the best video game music of all time. Streets of Rage 2 (1992) in particular is considered revolutionary for its "blend of swaggering house synths," "dirty" electro-funk and "trancey electronic textures that would feel as comfortable in a nightclub as a video game." Streets of Rage 3 is also considered ahead of its time, for its automatically generated randomized sequences, experimental hardcore "fast-beat techno like jungle" sounds, and trance music elements. The series' soundtracks have influenced a range of chiptune, electronica, grime and dubstep musicians through to the present day, including artists such as Ikonika, BT, Labrinth, Martyn, Joker, Darkstar, Childish Gambino, and Danger.

Novella
A Streets of Rage 2 novella (published together with a Street Fighter II novella) was written by Mat Yeo in 1993. It is just 35 pages long, based on the second game in the series, and was given away free with copies of Sega Force magazine in the United Kingdom.

 Film and television adaptations 
A feature film and television series based on the series was announced in 2016. The film will be written by Derek Kolstad and produced by dj2 Entertainment and Escape Artists. Lionsgate acquired the rights to the film in November 2022.

Notes

References

External links
 
 Ancient Corp, the developers of Streets of Rage 2 and 3''
 Streets of Rage 4 website
 

 
Sega beat 'em ups
Sega Games franchises
Beat 'em ups by series
Video game franchises introduced in 1991
Video games featuring female protagonists